Helvetia Tinde (Helvetia Peak) is the highest mountain in the Roosevelt Range, Northern Greenland. It is also the highest mountain of the northernmost mountain range on Earth.

Administratively it belongs to the Northeast Greenland National Park.

Geography
It is the highest peak of North Peary Land.

This mountain rises in the central region of the Roosevelt Range proper, west of the Polkorridoren (Polar Corridor) pass, about  SSW of the head of Sands Fjord.

Climbing history
Helvetia Tinde was first climbed in 1969 by the members of an expedition by the British Joint Services during a topographic and geological survey of the northern part of Peary Land. 

The second ascent of the summit (and 1st American) was made via a new route (east face) on 17 July 2001 by the 2001 Return To The Top Of The World Expedition led by John Jancik, Ken Zerbst and Terri Baker with David Baker, Jim McCrain, Jim Schaefer, Johan Llwyd, Joe Sears, Vernon Tejas, and Steve Gardiner.

See also
List of mountains in Greenland
Peary Land

References

External links
On top of the world
Crossing North Peary Land in Summer 1953
North America, Greenland, Roosevelt Range, J.V. Jensen Land, Avanarsuasua, Exploration

Mountains of Greenland
Roosevelt Range